Gaylor Peak is an 11,004-foot-elevation (3,354 meter) mountain summit located on the crest of the Sierra Nevada mountain range in northern California, United States. The peak is situated on the common boundary shared by Yosemite National Park with Inyo National Forest, as well as the border shared by Mono County with Tuolumne County. It rises immediately above the park's Tioga Pass entrance station and Tioga Lake. The peak is a popular hiking destination on summer weekends due to easy access via the two-mile Gaylor Lakes Trail from State Route 120 which traverses the east base of the peak.

History

This mountain's toponym was officially adopted by the United States Board on Geographic Names to honor Andrew Jack Gaylor (1846–1921), one of Yosemite's first park rangers. He died of a heart attack on April 19, 1921, while on patrol in the park, having worked 14 years for the National Park Service. Before this landform's name was adopted, early prospectors called the peak "Tioga Hill." The Great Sierra Mine Historic Site is located one-half mile north of the peak.

Climate
Gaylor Peak is located in an alpine climate zone. Most weather fronts originate in the Pacific Ocean, and travel east toward the Sierra Nevada mountains. As fronts approach, they are forced upward by the peaks (orographic lift), causing moisture in the form of rain or snowfall to drop onto the range. Precipitation runoff from this mountain drains west into Gaylor Lakes thence Dana Fork Tuolumne River, and east to Tioga Lake thence Lee Vining Creek and ultimately Mono Lake.

Gallery

See also

 List of mountain peaks of California

References

External links
 Weather forecast: Gaylor Peak
 Yosemite's First Rangers (photo): Flickr
 Jack Gaylor: obituary

Mountains of Mono County, California
Mountains of Tuolumne County, California
Mountains of Yosemite National Park
North American 3000 m summits
Mountains of Northern California
Sierra Nevada (United States)
Inyo National Forest